The Ushenish Lighthouse is an active lighthouse located in South Uist, Outer Hebrides, Scotland.

History
Ushenish Lighthouse was designed by engineers, David and Thomas Stevenson. Established in 1857, it incorporated a new 'condensing' apparatus developed by Thomas Stevenson as an improvement to the dioptric system. The lighthouse was automated in 1970, one of the first  major automatic lights. The gas-operated Dalen beacon was monitored from Neist Point Lighthouse, on Skye.

See also

 List of lighthouses in Scotland
 List of Northern Lighthouse Board lighthouses

References

External links
 Northern Lighthouse Board 
 Closeup of the lighthouse

Lighthouses completed in 1857
Lighthouses in Outer Hebrides
South Uist
1857 establishments in Scotland